Carlos Miguel dos Santos Pereira (born 9 October 1998), known as Carlos Miguel, is a Brazilian footballer who plays as a goalkeeper for Corinthians.

Club career

Internacional
Born in Rio das Ostras, Rio de Janeiro, Carlos Miguel began his career at Flamengo before joining Internacional's youth setup in 2016. On 9 December 2019, he was loaned to Santa Cruz for the season.

Carlos Miguel left Santa on 8 October 2020, after failing to make a single appearance, and moved to Boa Esporte also in a temporary deal on 20 January 2021. He made his senior debut on 12 March, starting in a 2–1 Campeonato Mineiro home win over Coimbra.

Carlos Miguel returned to Inter in April 2021, after eight appearances for Boa, but terminated his contract with the club on 11 August.

Corinthians
On 27 August 2021, Carlos Miguel signed a contract with Corinthians until December 2023. A third-choice behind Cássio and Matheus Donelli, he made his first team – and Série A – debut on 24 July 2022, playing the full 90 minutes in a 2–1 away win over Atlético Mineiro.

Personal life
Carlos Miguel's father José Cláudio was also a footballer and a goalkeeper. He represented Botafogo in the 1970s before being murdered in Macaé when Carlos Miguel was seven. His brother Júnior also played football as a youth.

Career statistics

References

External links
 Corinthians profile 

1998 births
Living people
Brazilian footballers
Sportspeople from Rio de Janeiro (state)
Association football goalkeepers
Campeonato Brasileiro Série A players
Sport Club Internacional players
Santa Cruz Futebol Clube players
Boa Esporte Clube players
Sport Club Corinthians Paulista players